Donald Douglas MacPhail (17 February 1911 - 1992) was a Scottish footballer who played for Dumbarton and Dunfermline Athletic in Scotland, for Middlesbrough, Bournemouth & Boscombe Athletic, Carlisle United and Swindon Town in the English Football League, and for South Bank, Burton Town, Nuneaton Town and Dartford in English non-league football.

References

1911 births
1992 deaths
Sportspeople from Dumbarton
Footballers from West Dunbartonshire
Scottish footballers
Association football outside forwards
Dumbarton F.C. players
South Bank F.C. players
Middlesbrough F.C. players
AFC Bournemouth players
Barnsley F.C. players
Carlisle United F.C. players
Burton Town F.C. players
Nuneaton Borough F.C. players
Swindon Town F.C. players
Dunfermline Athletic F.C. players
Dartford F.C. players
Scottish Football League players
English Football League players
Date of death missing